Brad Leland (born September 15, 1954) is an American film and television actor best known for his role as Buddy Garrity in the NBC/DirecTV series Friday Night Lights. He has appeared in over 100 feature films and television shows and numerous theater performances.

Early life and education
Leland was born in Lubbock, Texas, but his father's military career moved his family to Japan when he was five years old. Later, the family moved to Plano during his sophomore year in high school. While in Plano, Leland played football for Plano High School. He sustained a serious knee injury the year the Wildcats won the 1971 AAA State Championship. This injury forced him to leave behind athletics and transition into theater.

In 1980, Leland graduated from Texas Tech University with a bachelor's degree in acting and directing.

Career
Leland first appeared onstage at Disneyland at 6 years old in a Wild West show. That began his dream of being an entertainer. After graduating from college, Leland moved to Dallas where he worked in local theatre and found an agent. He also got a part in one episode of the TV series Dallas and in an episode of In the Heat of the Night. He later appeared in seven episodes of the TV series Walker, Texas Ranger, in the 2003 Texas Chain Saw Massacre remake, and as an executive in the film Hancock. His most visible roles, though, remain those of football booster John Aubrey in the film Friday Night Lights and of the similar character, Buddy Garrity, in the TV series of the same name.

After four decades of stage, film and television, he has appeared in several feature films and plays, and hundreds of television shows. Notable television includes Dallas, Walker Texas Ranger, In the Heat of the Night, Perry Mason, Veep, Justified, Parks and Recreation, CSI Miami, The Leftovers, Last Man Standing, The Cleveland Show, North and South, The Young Riders, and Le Bureau de Legendes.

Personal life 
Brad lives in Dallas, Texas and has been married to actress Freda Ramsey for 41 years. They have two daughters, Thea and Leah.

Filmography

Film

Television

References

External links

1954 births
American male film actors
American male television actors
American male stage actors
Male actors from Texas
People from Lubbock, Texas
Living people
Texas Tech University alumni
People from Plano, Texas
20th-century American male actors
21st-century American male actors
People from Allen, Texas